Christopher Pett (1620–1668) was an English shipbuilder for the Royal Navy and part of the Pett dynasty of shipbuilders. He is mentioned in the Diary of Samuel Pepys.

History

He was born on 4 May 1620, the eleventh child of many children to Phineas Pett, shipbuilder to the King, and his wife Ann Nicholls.

In 1647, he was appointed Master Shipwright at Deptford Dockyard in place of Peter, who moved to be Commissioner of Chatham Dockyard.

In the 1660s, he began building private yachts, over and above his Royal Navy commissions, as part of a current fashion, including a yacht for Sir William Batten.

He died suddenly in March 1668.

Ships built
HMS Speaker (1650) 50-gun ship of the line launched at Woolwich Dockyard
HMS Antelope (1652) 56-gun frigate launched at Woolwich Dockyard
HMS Swiftsure (1653) 56-gun ship of the line launched at Deptford Dockyard
Rose, 6-gun pink (1657) launched at Woolwich
Hart, 8-gun pink (1658) launched at Woolwich
HMS Richard (1658) 70-gun ship of the line launched at Woolwich
Anne, 8-gun yacht (1661) launched at Woolwich
Charles, 6-gun yacht (1662) launched at Woolwich
Henrietta, 8-gun yacht (1663) launched at Woolwich
HMS Royal Katherine (1664) 84-gun ship of the line launched at Woolwich
HMS Falcon (1666) 42-gun ship launched at Woolwich
HMS Greenwich (1666) 58-gun ship of the line launched at Woolwich
HMS St Andrew (1670) 100-gun ship of the line launched at Woolwich, one of the largest ships built at that date with a crew of 730 men. Begun by Pett finished by his brothers.

Family
His widow Ann Pett wrote to Samuel Pepys to help her gain a pension from the King. She later married shipwright Daniel Furzer.

References
 

1620 births
1668 deaths
English shipbuilders